The BBC National Programme was a radio service which was on the air from 9 March 1930 – replacing the earlier BBC's experimental station 5XX – until 1 September 1939 when it was subsumed into the Home Service, two days before the outbreak of World War II.

Both the National Programme and the Regional Programme provided a mixed mainstream radio service. Whilst the two services provided different programming, allowing listeners a choice they were not streamed to appeal to different audiences, rather they were intended to offer a choice of programming to a single audience. While using the same transmitters, the National Programme broadcast significantly more speech and classical music than its successor, the Light Programme. Similarly, the Regional Programme broadcast much more light and dance music than its successor, the Home Service.

History

Development
When the British Broadcasting Company (later to be nationalised as the British Broadcasting Corporation) began transmissions on 14 November 1922, the technology for both national coverage and joint programming between transmitters did not exist – transmitter powers were generally in the region of 1 kilowatt (kW).

From 9 July 1924, however the company began experimenting with higher power longwave transmissions from the Marconi Company's site near Chelmsford in Essex, using the call sign 5XX. The experiments proved successful and on 27 July 1925, the Chelmsford longwave transmitter was relocated to a more central site at Borough Hill near Daventry in Northamptonshire. This provided a "national service" of programmes originating in London, although it remained somewhat experimental and was supplementary to the BBC's locally based services including its main station, 2LO.

Medium wave transmitters were used to augment coverage.

Regional scheme
On 21 August 1927, the BBC opened a high-power medium wave transmitter at the Daventry 5GB site to replace the existing local stations in the English Midlands, that allowed the experimental longwave transmitter 5XX to provide a service programmed from London for the majority of the population, this came to be called the National Programme.

By combining the resources of the local stations into one regional station in each area with a basic sustaining service from London, the BBC hoped to increase programme quality whilst also centralising the management of the radio service known as the "regional scheme", and eventually resulted in the gradual extension throughout the decade of a separate Regional Programme.

The local stations were gradually either converted to regional relays or closed entirely and replaced by high-power Regional Programme transmitters. Some local studios were retained to provide for programming from specific areas within each region. Most transmitters also carried the National Programme on a local frequency to supplement the longwave broadcasts from 5XX, initially these were on three separate frequencies in order to minimise interference. By 1939 as the Regional Programme network expanded, the three remaining medium wave transmitters – at Brookmans Park (for London and the South East), Moorside Edge (for the North), and Westerglen (for central Scotland) – were all using .

Broadcasting hours
The National Programme's broadcasting hours were from Mondays to Saturdays at around 10.15am until midnight, with Sundays commence broadcasting at 3.00pm. However by the mid-1930s, broadcasting on a Sunday was extended to commence at around 10.30am.

BBC News on the National Programme would not air until at least 6.00pm each day, this was in agreement with several newspapers to ensure people would buy a morning edition. Thus did not have a dedicated news department until 1934, and only then was it used to edit and broadcast news material from other wire agencies in the country and around the world. The start of World War II on 1 September 1939 would see the start of a proper news on the new Home Service with morning news bulletins commencing at 7.00am each day.

Closure
Upon the outbreak of World War II, the BBC closed both existing National and Regional radio programmes to replace them with a single channel known as the Home Service. The main transmitter network was synchronised between just two groups, using 668 and 767 kHz, each of which could be turned off during air raids to prevent their signals being used as navigational beacons (with listeners required to retune in such an event to a low-powered single-frequency network on ).

On 29 July 1945, within 12 weeks of Victory in Europe Day, the BBC reactivated the Regional Programme but retained the name "Home Service" (until 30 September 1967 as the station became Radio 4). On the same date, the Light Programme was launched by taking over the style and much of the function as an entertainment channel of the Forces Programme which had begun broadcasting on 7 January 1940, as well as the Droitwich  longwave frequency which had been used by the pre-war National Programme.

Sources

References

Further reading
 
 
 
 
 
 
 

BBC Radio
Defunct BBC national radio stations
Radio stations established in 1930
Radio stations disestablished in 1939
1930 establishments in the United Kingdom
1939 disestablishments in the United Kingdom
1930s in the United Kingdom
Interwar period